Simpang Kiri Mukim is a mukim, located in Batu Pahat district, Johore. Batu Pahat district is divided into 14 mukims, each of which encompasses several villages.

External links 
 Pejabat Daerah Batu Pahat.
 Pecahan daerah Batu Pahat.

Mukims of Batu Pahat District